Clyde's Restaurant Group is a subsidiary of Graham Holdings that owns and operates 11 restaurants in the Washington metropolitan area. Founded in 1963 to take advantage of a change in the district's liquor laws, it pioneered a number of changes in the way restaurants in the district operated. In 1970, it purchased the oldest restaurant in the district, Old Ebbitt Grill. The company has since expanded its namesake "Clyde's" restaurant into a small chain, as well as opened and purchased other restaurants.

History
On August 12, 1963, investment banker Stuart C. Davidson opened Clyde's of Georgetown. For many decades, hard liquor could be served in the District of Columbia only to patrons seated at tables. President John F. Kennedy signed legislation in May 1962 allowing liquor to be sold to patrons standing up. When no other restaurant/bar opened in the district, Davidson decided to enter the restaurant business. Clyde's opened in a former biker bar known as the B&J Restaurant. When B&J lost its lease after one too many brawls occurred there, Davidson rented the two front rooms of the building and established Clyde's there. The oak bar was retained, and the decor changed to an assortment of oddities. The first Clyde's restaurant was in Georgetown, the first bar/restaurant in Georgetown to open on a Sunday, the first restaurant in Georgetown to serve brunch, and the first restaurant in Georgetown to hire women as waiters. Georgetown University student John Laytham began working at Clyde's as a busboy six months after it opened. Although he never graduated from the university, in 1968 Laytham became the restaurant's general manager. In 1970, Davidson asked Laytham to join him as a partner in Clyde's (giving him 20 percent of the ownership).

The 1976 hit song "Afternoon Delight" by Starland Vocal Band was inspired by the spicy happy hour menu at Clyde's of Georgetown. Writer Bill Danoff ate at Clyde's one afternoon, then came home and told his wife that "afternoon delight" should really refer to sexual intercourse. (The song only vaguely hints at sex.)

In 1970, Davidson and Laytham purchased the Old Ebbitt Grill, which originally opened in 1856. In December 1985, Clyde's Restaurant Group purchased from founder Richard J. McCooey three notable D.C. drinking and dining establishments: The Tombs, 1789 Restaurant, and F. Scott's. These restaurants underwent a significant renovation from 2016-18, and F. Scott's was closed, becoming a new bar and lounge area for 1789.

Clyde's Restaurant Group subsequently opened three more locations under the "Clyde's" name in Columbia, Maryland (1975); Tysons Corner, Virginia (1980); Reston Town Center in Reston, Virginia (1991); Chevy Chase, Maryland (1995); Alexandria, Virginia (1998); and Gallery Place in Washington, D.C. (2005). Clyde's Restaurant Group also opened several restaurants which are not branded under the "Clyde's" name. These include The Tomato Palace (1993), which opened next door to the Clyde's location in Columbia; Tower Oaks Lodge in the Tower Oaks development of Rockville, Maryland (2002); Clyde's Willow Creek Farm in Broadlands, Virginia (2006); and The Hamilton in Washington, D.C. (2011). According to Laytham, Boston Properties, the developer of the Tower Oaks office park, allowed Clyde's restaurant use of the land rent-free, and built the infrastructure of the restaurant at no cost as well. The Van Metre Companies, developer of the Broadlands mixed-use planned community, provided the same package of rent-free land and no-cost infrastructure to allow the construction of Clyde's Willow Creek Farm. Clyde's Restaurant Group also received a major financial incentive to open  The Hamilton. The company secured a 40-year lease from the landlord (Germany-based Deka Immobilien Investment) at $20.00 per square foot, which rises to just $29 per square foot after 40 years. Although the multi-level restaurant and music venue cost $24 million to construct, the District of Columbia gave Clyde's $5 million in tax increment financing. Within a year of its opening, Laytham said it employed 355 people. According to Laytham in 2012, the company was opening a new location "Every few years".

The Tysons Corner location closed on February 5, 2017, to make way for development of the Tysons Central residential and commercial building project. On July 4, 2017, Clyde's Restaurant Group closed The Tomato Palace, and repurposed the  space into a music venue called The Soundry, which opened on June 1, 2018. Due to the ongoing COVID-19 pandemic, the Columbia location and The Soundry permanently closed on July 19, 2020. The Reston location closed on May 21, 2022.

Clyde's founder Stuart Davidson died on August 1, 2001. Clyde's co-owner and CEO John Laytham died on January 3, 2019. In July 2019, Clyde's Restaurant Group was acquired by Graham Holdings.

References

External links

Why Is It Named Clyde's of Georgetown? - Ghosts of DC

1963 establishments in Washington, D.C.
2019 mergers and acquisitions
American companies established in 1963
Restaurant groups in the United States
Restaurants established in 1963
Restaurants in Maryland
Restaurants in Virginia
Restaurants in Washington, D.C.